WPRE (980 AM) is a radio station  broadcasting a classic hits format to the Prairie du Chien, Wisconsin, United States, area.  WPRE began as a daytime only station, but now broadcasts at night with reduced power. The station is licensed to Robinson Corporation which is owned by David and Jane Robinson. WPRE has an FM sister station at 94.3 MHz. with the call letters WQPC (formerly WPRE-FM).

The transmitter and broadcast tower are located on the west side of Prairie du Chien next to the Mississippi River.

On August 30, 2014, changed their format from oldies (as "Cruisin' 980") to classic hits, branded as "Prairie's Own".

References

External links

PRE
Classic hits radio stations in the United States